Aspire is an American pay television channel targeting African Americans. The network was launched by Magic Johnson on June 27, 2012.

History
As part of its arrangement to acquire a minority interest in NBCUniversal, Comcast Corporation committed to carry several minority-owned channels.  The arrangement followed pressure led by Maxine Waters in congressional hearings. In April 2011, Comcast solicited proposals for minority-owned networks. In February 2012, Comcast announced distribution arrangements for four networks, including Aspire. The four announced networks and six forthcoming stations are being chosen from among an excess of 100 proposals to begin airing by 2020.

Aspire also holds the broadcast rights to a selection of CIAA college football games involving historically black colleges and universities.

See also

 BET – American basic cable and satellite channel currently owned by Paramount, which launched in 1980 as the first television network devoted to programming targeting African-Americans.
 BET Her – spinoff/sister network targeting African-American women.
 Bounce TV – American digital multicast network owned by E. W. Scripps Company.
 TheGrio – American digital multicast/cable network owned by Allen Media Group
 TV One – Cable and satellite network targeting African-Americans, owned by Urban One.
 Cleo TV – Spinoff/sister network targeting African-American women.

Notes

Television channels and stations established in 2012
Television networks in the United States
English-language television stations in the United States
African-American television
African-American television networks
Magic Johnson